This is a list of cemeteries located in Philippines provinces in Luzon, Visayas, and Mindanao regions. This list includes classical cemeteries (such as burial caves, burial mounds, limestone tombs, aerial cemeteries, coastal burial lands, and burial trees), colonial cemeteries (such as Spanish-style cemeteries and American-style cemeteries), and modern cemeteries (such as ash cemeteries)

 Baguio Cemetery, Baguio
 Clark Veterans Cemetery, Clark Freeport Zone
 Nagcarlan Underground Cemetery, Nagcarlan, Laguna
 San Joaquin Campo Santo, San Joaquin, Iloilo
 Batanes Boat Tombs
 Limestone tombs of Kamhantik
 Kabayan burial caves and other burial caves in the Cordilleras
 Burial caves of Mindoro
 Camiguin sunken cemetery
 Tagalog Burial Trees
 Burial caves in Panay
 Burial caves in Romblon
 Burial caves in Mindanao
 Hanging burial sites of Sagada
 Familia Luzuriaga Cemetery
 Paco Park cemetery
 Bajau coastal cemetery
 Tombs of Sulu Royalties
 Tombs of Maguindanao Royalties
 Tombs of Lanao Royalties

Philippines
 
Cemeteries